Stephanie Frausto is an American mixed martial artist who competes in the Atomweight division. She has fought in Invicta FC and  Bellator. She is the younger sister of former Bellator women's Strawweight Champion Zoila Frausto.

Championships and accomplishments
King of the Cage
KOTC Strawweight Championship (1 time)

Mixed martial arts record

|-
| Loss
| align=center| 8–9
| Camila Rivarola
| Decision (unanimous)
| Combate: Bravo vs. Estrada
| 
| align=center| 3
| align=center| 5:00
| Medley, Florida, United States
| 
|-
| Loss
| align=center| 8–8
| Yazmin Jauregui
| Decision (unanimous)
| Combate Global
| 
| align=center| 3
| align=center| 5:00
| Miami, Florida, United States
| 
|-
| Loss
| align=center| 8–7
| Luana Pinheiro
| TKO (punches)
| Dana White's Contender Series 35
| 
| align=center| 1
| align=center| 2:48
| Las Vegas, Nevada, United States
| 
|-
| Win
| align=center| 8–6
| Charisa Sigala
| TKO (punches)
| Combate Americas - Mexico vs. USA
| 
| align=center| 2
| align=center| 4:06
| Fresno, California, United States
| 
|-
| Win
| align=center| 7–6
| Celine Haga
| TKO (punches)
| Combate Americas - Fresno
| 
| align=center| 2
| align=center| 4:59
| Fresno, California, United States
| 
|-
| Win
| align=center| 6–6
| Angela Danzig
| Decision (unanimous)
| KOTC: Flashback
| 
| align=center| 5
| align=center| 5:00
| Oroville, California, United States
|  Won the KOTC Strawweight Championship
|-
| Loss
| align=center| 5–6
| Jamielene Nievara
| TKO (punches)
| Bellator 154
| 
| align=center| 3
| align=center| 2:43
| San Jose, California, United States
| 
|-
| Win
| align=center| 5–5
| Maria Andaverde
| Submission (armbar)
| KOTC - Total Elimination
| 
| align=center| 2
| align=center| 3:05
| Oroville, California, United States
| 
|-
| Loss
| align=center| 4–5
| Cassie Rodish
| TKO (punches and elbows)
| Invicta FC 4
| 
| align=center| 3
| align=center| 1:04
| Kansas City, Kansas, United States
| 
|-
| Win
| align=center| 4–4
| Amy Davis
| Submission (guillotine choke)
| Invicta FC 3
| 
| align=center| 1
| align=center| 0:48
| Kansas City, Kansas, United States
| 
|-
| Win
| align=center| 3–4
| Diana Rael
| Submission (armbar)
| WFC - Women's Fighting Championship 1
| 
| align=center| 1
| align=center| 3:25
| Casper, Wyoming, United States
| 
|-
| Loss
| align=center| 2–4
| Ashley Cummins
| Decision (unanimous)
| NAAFS - Caged Fury 16
| 
| align=center| 3
| align=center| 3:00
| Morgantown, West Virginia, United States
| 
|-
| loss
| align=center| 2–3
| Paulina Ramirez
| Decision (split)
| TPF 6: High Stakes
| 
| align=center| 3
| align=center| 3:00
| Lemoore, Californie, United States
| 
|-
| Loss
| align=center| 2–2
| Lisa Ellis
| Technical Submission (rear-naked choke)
| Bellator 22
| 
| align=center| 1
| align=center| 2:01
| Kansas City, Missouri, United States
| 
|-
| Win
| align=center| 2–1
| Elaine Garza
| TKO (punches)
| TWC 8 - Meltdown
| 
| align=center| 1
| align=center| 2:18
| Porterville, California, United States
| 
|-
| Loss
| align=center| 1–1
| Trisha Pinon
| Submission (armbar)
| TWC 7 - Violence
| 
| align=center| 1
| align=center| 2:18
| Porterville, California, United States
| 
|-
| Win
| align=center| 1–0
| Erica Madrid
| TKO (punches)
| TWC 6 - Primitive Rage
| 
| align=center| 1
| align=center| 2:42
| Porterville, California, United States
|

References

External links

Official Stephanie Frausto Tee KO Page

1990 births
Living people
Strawweight mixed martial artists
American female mixed martial artists
Atomweight mixed martial artists
Mixed martial artists from Ohio
21st-century American women